Sona Rahimova (born 14 July 2001) is an Azerbaijani footballer, who plays as a midfielder and a forward for Amed SFK in the Turkish Women's Super League and the Azerbaijan women's national team.

Club career 
By December 2021, she moved to Turkey and joined Kayseri Women's FC to play in the 2021–22 Women's Super League. On 6 September 2022, she left Turkey. In October 2022, she returned to Turkey again, and joined the Diyarbakır-based club Amed SFK.

See also 
List of Azerbaijan women's international footballers

References 

2001 births
Living people
Azerbaijani women's footballers
Women's association football midfielders
Women's association football forwards
Azerbaijan women's international footballers
Azerbaijani expatriate footballers
Azerbaijani expatriate sportspeople in Turkey
Expatriate women's footballers in Turkey
Turkish Women's Football Super League players
Kayseri Women's footballers
Amed S.K. (women) players